Radhika Ranjan Gupta (died 15 May 1998) was an Indian politician. He was Chief Minister of Tripura in India from 26 July 1977 to 4 November 1977. At that time the socio-international situation was unfavourable. On 26 July 1977, he, as the leader of a short-lived coalition between the Janata Party and the left, became the fourth Chief Minister of the state.

References

1998 deaths
Year of birth missing
Chief Ministers of Tripura
Tripura MLAs 1977–1983
Indian National Congress politicians
Janata Party politicians
Chief ministers from Janata Party
Tripura politicians